Jarvik is a surname. Notable people with the surname include:

 Erik Jarvik (1907–1998), Swedish paleozoologist
 Robert Jarvik (b. 1946), American scientist and inventor
 A series of artificial hearts
 Lissy Jarvik (1924–2021), American psychiatrist
 Murray Jarvik (1923–2008), American researcher and scientist and late husband of Lissy
 Co inventor of the Nicotine Patch
 Jarvik, a 2019 short film by Emilie Mannering